The 1954 Los Angeles Rams season was the team's 17th year with the National Football League and the ninth season in Los Angeles.

Schedule

Standings

References

Los Angeles Rams
Los Angeles Rams seasons
Los Angeles